Bogomila is a village in the municipality of Čaška, North Macedonia. It is located in the central part of the North Macedonia, close to the city of Veles and it used to be a municipality of its own.

Demographics
On the 1927 ethnic map of Leonhard Schulze-Jena, the village is written as "Bogumil" and shown as a Serbianized Bulgarian Christian village. According to the 2021 census, the village had a total of 359 inhabitants. Ethnic groups in the village include:
Macedonians 319
Persons for whom data are taken from administrative sources 32
Albanians 3
Serbs 1

Others 33

Notable People

 Macedonian Bulgarian revolutionary Petar Poparsov.

References

Villages in Čaška Municipality